Sundha Mata temple is a nearly 900-year-old temple of Mother goddess Chamunda situated on a hilltop called Sundha, located at Longitude 72.367°E and Latitude 24.833°N, in Jalore District of Rajasthan. It is 64 km from Mount Abu and 20 km from the town of Bhinmal.

Geography
At 1220 m height in the Aravalli ranges on Sundha mountain There is a temple of goddesses Chamunda Devi, Worshipped as Sundha Matha by devotees. It is 105 km from district headquarters and 35 km. from sub divisional Bhinmal. 
This place lies in Raniwara Teshil in the mid-east of Malwara to Jaswantpura Road near Dantlawas village.

Many Devotees from Gujarat and Rajasthan and the rest of India visit it. The environment here is fresh and attractive.  The waterfalls flows year-round  at the mountain , Many Communities of different caste established community centres for devotees, there are very good facilities to stay at hilltop at night and worship Goddess Chamunda.

Architecture
Sundha Mata temple is made up of white marble, the pillars reminds of the art of Abu's Dilwara temples pillars. A very beautiful idol of goddess Chamunda stands under the huge stone. Here Chamunda's head is worshipped. It is said that the trunk of mother Chamunda are established in Korta and legs in Sundarla Pal (Jalore). In front of mother Chamunda a BhurBhuva Swaweshwar Shivling is established. In the main temple a duo idol of Shiva and Parvati, Ganesh's idol are considered very old and extinct.

History
In the temple premises there are three historically significant inscriptions that highlight the history of the region. The temple of Sundhamata was constructed by Dewal Pratiharas with the help of Imperial Chauhans of Jalore. The first inscription is from AD 1262, which describes victory of Chauhans and the downfall of Parmaras. The second inscription is from 1326, and the third one is from 1727.

The Sundha inscriptions are of particular importance in historical sense—like the Harishen inscription or Delhi's Mehrauli pillar inscription. Sundha inscriptions throw light on the history of India.

In ancient days worship in this temple was done by Nath Yogis. Emperor of the Sirohi state gave land of the "Sonani", "Dedol" and "Sundha ki dhani" villages to one of the  Nath Yogi Rabad Nath Ji, who worshiped in Sundha Mata Temple at that time. After the death of one of the Nath yogi Ajay Nath ji, no one was there to do the worship so Ram Nath ji (Aayas of Mengalwa that time) was taken there to take the responsibility. The land of Mengalwa and Chitrodi villages were given to these Nath Yogis in ancient days by king of Jodhpur Maharaja Jaswant Singh. So Nath yogi of Mengalwa were called as "Aayas".  After the death of Ram Nath ji, Badri Nath ji, pupil of Ram nath Ji became Aayas at Sundha Mata temple and took the responsibility of worship. He also looked after land of  "Sonani", "Dedol" ,"Mengalwa" and "Chitrodi". As the time passed, no one was there to do all the management, so a trust (Sundha Mata Trust) was created to look after temple and manage tourism.

Shri Nath Ji Soni Sahib of Jaisalmer, the royal jewellers of the Jaisalmer State was also one of the prominent devotee of Sundhamata, another form of Chamunda Mata in Bhinmal, Jalore. Sundha Mata is the Kuldevi of the Shrimali Brahman Sonar of Lahecha Gotra i.e. Nathani Sonar.

Wildlife sanctuary
There is a wildlife sanctuary nearby covering an area of 107 square kilometers. Nearest  Khodeswar Mahadeva  in Jawiya forest area also has wildlife and natural spots in the sanctuary.  Sloth bear, Nilgai jungle cat, desert fox, striped hyena, hanuman langoor, vulture, owl, Indian porcupine, rock and jungle bush, quail, spotted dove, and 120 species of birds are found here.

Fairs 
During Navratri tourists from Gujarat and nearby areas come in a large numbers. Regular buses are run by Gujarat roadways from Palanpur, Deesa and elsewhere during that time.

Amenities 
Near the temple area a big Community Hall is established by the Trust for devotees to rest during the night and enjoy the scenery of the mountain.

Recently, a ropeway service  has been started to climb Sundha Mountain, to make the journey easier for pilgrims, making it a memorable experience. Ropeway to the temple—first in Rajasthan—is ready, Rs 130 for both ways (Up & Down) and for up only RS. 106. For senior citizens RS. 65 (Age proof is required)

See also
Kshemkari Mata Temple
72 Jinalaya Temple

References

Jalore district web site
Website of Sundha Mata Tirtha

External links
About Sundha Mata Temple
News18

Hindu temples in Rajasthan
Tourist attractions in Jalore district
Temples of Jalore District